Connie Sue Clark (born December 20, 1965) is an |American, former collegiate All-American right-handed softball pitcher and head coach. Clark began her college softball career at the junior college level before finishing her last two years with the Cal State Fullerton Titans from 1986–87 and leading them to the 1986 Women's College World Series championship title. She is the Big West Conference career leader in ERA and WHIP for her two seasons, she also ranks top-10 for those records for both the Titans and the NCAA Division I. 

Clark was named the inaugural head coach of the Texas Longhorns softball program, a position she held from 1997 to 2018. Along the way she was mentor to athletes Christa Williams, Cat Osterman and Blaire Luna and coached teams to a first No. 1 softball ranking, five college World Series and three national semifinal finishes. Clark was also a head coach for the Netherlands.

Early life and education
Clark was born and raised in Glendale, Arizona and graduated from Greenway High School in nearby Phoenix in 1983. At Central Arizona Junior College, Clark pitched on the softball team under head coach Mike Candrea and led the team to National Junior College Athletic Association titles in 1984 and 1985.

California State Fullerton
Transferring to Cal State Fullerton, Clark had a 20–2 record and nation-best 0.18 ERA leading the Titans to the 1986 Women's College World Series title. She earned First Team All-Big West honors. At the World Series, Clark pitched three shutouts and surrendered just one hit and struck out 8 in the title game to defeat the Texas A&M Aggies 3-0 on May 25. She was named to the All-Tournament Team for her efforts.

As a senior in 1987, Clark went 33–5. She won the Broderick Award (now the Honda Sports Award) as the nation's top softball player in 1987. She earned First Team All-American recognition from the National Fastpitch Coaches Association and another conference honor. Clark and the Titans returned to the World Series to defend their title but eventually lost the UCLA Bruins on May 23. Clark tossed 6 innings and struck out 4 in her final appearance.

After graduating from Cal State Fullerton, Clark pitched for Team USA in 1987.

Coaching career
From 1990 to 1995, Clark was an assistant coach at Florida State University. She became the inaugural head softball coach at the University of Texas at Austin in June 1995, leading the Texas Longhorns from 1997 to 2018 with a cumulative 873–401–3 record, four Big 12 Conference regular season titles, four Big 12 Conference softball tournament titles, and 19 appearances in the NCAA Tournament, including five in the Women's College World Series.

Statistics

Cal State Fullerton Titans

Head Coaching Record
Sources:

References

External links
 

1965 births
Living people
Female sports coaches
American softball coaches
Softball coaches from Arizona
Cal State Fullerton Titans softball players
Florida State Seminoles softball coaches
Texas Longhorns softball coaches
Central Arizona Vaqueros softball players
Sportspeople from Glendale, Arizona
Softball players from Arizona